The Miami Beach Resort and Spa is a historic resort hotel opened in 1963 as the Doral Hotel On-The-Ocean on the famous Millionaire's Row at 4833 Collins Avenue in Miami Beach, Florida.

History
Designed by architect Melvin Grossman and constructed by builder Robert Turchin, the hotel, also known as the Doral Beach Hotel, was named for the owner's wife Doris and the owner Alfred Kaskel. The hotel opened on February 15, 1963, as the sister hotel to the Doral Country Club on the mainland (now in Doral, Florida), where the Doral Open was played until 2006. The Doral Beach Hotel was long considered the most elegant and luxurious hotel in the area. It won several of the coveted Mobil Five Star awards. The hotel hosted the headquarters of George McGovern during the 1972 Democratic National Convention.  The Doral was home away from home for movie stars and presidents.

Several scenes from the hit 1972 film The Heartbreak Kid were shot on location at the hotel. The movie shows the lobby, room 1704, the bar adjacent to the Starlight Roof restaurant on the 18th floor of the hotel, and the pool area and beach.

In the 1990s the hotel changed hands several times. It was first purchased from the original family in the early 1990s by a French company and renamed the Doral Ocean Beach Resort. The French OBR company then sold it to Interstate Hotels in 1997 and it became a Westin, The Westin Resort Miami Beach. In September 1998, Interstate Hotels was purchased by Wyndham International and the property was renamed the Wyndham Miami Beach Resort. In 2006 the Blackstone Group, a large conglomerate, purchased Wyndham International. Some of the Wyndham hotels were merged into LXR Luxury Resorts, another chain owned by Blackstone. Today, the hotel is known as the Miami Beach Resort and Spa, an LXR hotel. The property was closed in 2019 by the new owners, the Chetrit family.

OBR retained a portion of the property adjacent to the hotel when it was sold to Interstate. Originally containing a parking lot, two tennis courts and additional beach access, OBR built the Grand Beach Hotel on this land in 2009. In addition, OBR retained the rights to the Doral name.

Sources 
ciudad doral newspaper
Time Magazine July 10, 1972

References

Hotels in Miami Beach, Florida
Hotels established in 1963
Hotel buildings completed in 1963
1963 establishments in Florida